John Pye (fl. 1430s) was a Canon of Windsor from 1430 to 1439

Career

He was appointed:
Rector of St Mary Abchurch 1431 - 1433
Master of St Laurence Pountney 1433 - 1435
Rector of King’s Cliffe, Northamptonshire 1419 - 1420
Rector of St Mary Bothaw until 1420
Rector of Great Brickhill, Buckinghamshire

He was appointed to the first stall in St George's Chapel, Windsor Castle in 1430 and held the canonry until 1439.

Notes 

Canons of Windsor